Radio KOL was an internet station that aired on AOL from 2003 to 2007.  The show's DJ was Rick Adams.  The show grew to over 1,000,000 listeners.

History 
The show started as an experiment with AOL's new service, KOL or "Kids Online".  The show grew quickly to over 1,000,000 listeners per week. It was the first live radio show  broadcast on AOL for children aged 6 to 15.  Adams frequently entertained listeners with guest celebrities visiting the show and a variety of games including "MooBaa", where DJ Rick would give a guest 30 seconds to guess whether an animal he names is a cow (by saying Moo) or a sheep (by saying Baa). There was an AIM tie-in with a chatbot named Felg, who could be used to send song suggestions to DJ Rick.

On November 25, 2007, DJ Rick announced AOL would be canceling Radio KOL.  Three days later, on November 28, Radio KOL presented its final show. On 13 February 2008, AOL shut down the remaining stream of the archived Radio KOL broadcasts.

Notes 

Internet radio stations in the United States
Defunct radio stations in the United States
AOL
Children's radio stations in the United States
Radio stations established in 2003
Radio stations disestablished in 2007
2007 disestablishments in the United States
2003 establishments in the United States